The 1911 Lafayette football team was an American football team that represented Lafayette College as an independent during the 1911 college football season. Under head coaches Bob Folwell (first five games) and Samuel B. Newton (final five games), the team compiled an 8–2 record. William Dannehower was the team captain.  The team played its home games at March Field in Easton, Pennsylvania.

Schedule

References

Lafayette
Lafayette Leopards football seasons
Lafayette football